The 2021 Gatorade PSL Beach Volleyball Challenge Cup was the first conference and for the Philippine Super Liga's ninth season. The tournament was held on February 26 and 27, 2021 at the Subic Tennis Center of the Subic Bay Metropolitan Authority at Subic Bay. The tournament marked the resumption of PSL games since the cancellation of the 2020 season due to the COVID-19 pandemic. The tournament was approved by the Inter-Agency Task Force for the Management of Emerging Infectious Diseases (IATF), through its Resolution 79, allowing the staging of the tournament using a bubble setup in Subic. It became the final tournament of the PSL.

A beach tournament was originally planned to be held in November 2020 as part of its cancelled eighth season but postponed due to several factors, including the onslaught of Typhoon Goni (Rolly) and the COVID-19 pandemic.

Women's

Preliminary round

Pool A

|}

|}

Pool B

|}

|}

Playoffs

Quarterfinals

|}

|}

For 7th place

|}

For 5th place

|}

For 3rd place

|}

Women's finals

|}

Final standing

Men's
No men's tournament.

Venue
 Subic Tennis Center (Subic Bay Metropolitan Authority)

References

Beach Volleyball
Beach volleyball competitions in the Philippines
PSL
PSL Beach Volleyball Challenge Cup